Jeon (전), also often spelled Jun, Chun or Chon, is a common Korean family name. As of the South Korean census of 2000, there were 687,867 people with this name in South Korea. It can be written with three different hanja, each with different meanings and indicating different lineages.
 (온전할 전 onjeonhal jeon, "whole"). This is the most common character, used by 493,419 people in 153,208 households according to the 2000 Census. The surname has a Baekje origin. It is also said that when Goryeo dynasty fell, many changed their royal surname Wang to Jeon (全) / Ok (玉) to avoid severe persecution by the succeeding Joseon dynasty. 
 (밭 전 bat jeon, "field"). This is the second-most common character, used by 188,354 people in 58,895 households. The surname has a Goryeo origin.  
  (돈 전 don jeon, "money"). This is the least common character, used by 6,094 people in 1,883 households.

In a study by the National Institute of Korean Language based on 2007 application data for South Korean passports, it was found that 67% of people with this family name spelled it in Latin letters as Jeon in their passports, while 23% spelled it Jun, and 5% spelled it Chun. Rarer alternative spellings (the remaining 5%) included Chon, Cheon, Jean, Jeun, Jen, Jhun, and Zeon.

People
 Jeon Woo-chi, Taoist scholar
 Jeon Bongjun, South Korean activist 
 Jeon Ok, Korean actress and singer
 Jeon No-min (born Jeon Jae-ryong), South Korean actor
 Jun Tae-soo, South Korean actor
 Jeon Hye-jin (actress, born 1976), South Korean actress
 Jeon Hye-jin (actress, born 1988), South Korean actress
 Jeon Jun-hyeok, South Korean actor and model
 Yeojin Jeon, South Korean actress
 Jeon Soo-jin, South Korean actress
 Jeon Soo-kyeong, South Korean actress
 Jeon In-kwon, South Korean singer
 Jungkook (full name Jeon Jung-kook), South Korean singer, member of BTS
 Jun Hyun-moo, South Korean host and television personality
 Jeon Do-yeon, South Korean actress
 Jeon Yeo-been, South Korean actress
 Ha Ji-won (born Jeon Hae-rim), South Korean actress
 Jeon Hye-bin, South Korean actress and singer
 Jeon Ji-yoon, South Korean singer-songwriter and actress
 Jeon In-hwa, South Korean actress
 Jeon Jong-seo, South Korean actress
 Jeon Ye-seo, South Korean actress
 Jeon Min-seo, South Korean actress
 Jeon So-nee, South Korean actress
 Jeon Boram, South Korean singer and actress, member of T-ara
 Jun Jae-youn, South Korean badminton player
 Jeon Yeo-ok, South Korean politician
 Jun Hyo-seong, South Korean singer, member of Secret
 Jeon Sang-guk, South Korean author
 Jeon So-min, South Korean actress, regular cast member of Running Man
 Jeon Da-hye, South Korean short track speed skater
 Jeon Tae-il, South Korean activist 
 Chun Doo-hwan, South Korean politician, a president of South Korea
 Jun Ji-hyun (born Wang Ji-hyun), South Korean actress
 Byeong Sam Jeon, South Korean artist
 Jeon So-mi, Canadian singer based in South Korea, former member of I.O.I
 Jeon So-yeon, South Korean rapper, member of (G)I-dle
 Jeon Sung-woo, South Korean actor
 Jeon Seok-ho, South Korean actor
 Jeon Mi-do, South Korean actress
 Jeon So-min, South Korean singer, member of Kard

See also
 List of Korean family names
 Korean name

References

Korean-language surnames